"Wait for You" is a song by Scottish singer-songwriter Tom Walker. The song was released as a digital download on 13 June 2020 as the lead single from his upcoming second studio album. The song was written by Tom Walker, Cam Blackwood and Joel Laslett Pott. A remix of the song featuring German singer Zoe Wees was released on 11 September 2020.

Background
Walker said, "This song is about a mate of mine who went through a life-changing event as a teenager. It took a long time for him to heal… now he's one of the most outgoing, positive people you could ever meet." Walker performed the song during a 'Zoom World Tour' in six countries over 12 hours.

Music video
A music video to accompany the release of "Wait for You" was first released onto YouTube on 19 June 2020.

Track listing

Charts

Certifications

References

2020 singles
2020 songs
Tom Walker (singer) songs
Songs written by Joel Pott
Songs written by Cam Blackwood
Song recordings produced by Cam Blackwood
Songs written by Tom Walker (singer)